Ariobarzanes of Cappadocia may refer to:
 Ariobarzanes I of Cappadocia, king of Cappadocia from 93 BC to ca. 63 or 62 BC
 Ariobarzanes II of Cappadocia, son and successor of Ariobarzanes I, murdered some time before 51 BC
 Ariobarzanes III of Cappadocia, son and successor of Ariobarzanes II, who ruled from ca. 51 BC until his execution in 42 BC

See also
 Ariobarzanes (disambiguation)